Evania is a genus of ensign wasps in the family Evaniidae. Like all members of the family, they are cockroach egg parasitoids. There are more than 60 described species in Evania. Evania appendigaster, the blue-eyed ensign wasp, is a common wasp found through most of the world.

Species
These 66 species belong to the genus Evania:

References

Further reading

External links

 

Evanioidea
Hymenoptera genera
Taxa named by Johan Christian Fabricius